Giacomo Modica (born May 31, 1964) is an Italian football manager and former midfielder who formerly was a technical collaborator for Zdeněk Zeman, and is the current head coach of Vibonese in the Serie D league.

Career

As manager 
After a playing career spent with several Serie B and Serie C1 teams, most notably Palermo and Padova, he moved into coaching, working as Zdeněk Zeman's assistant for six years (even following him at Fenerbahçe) before becoming a head coach himself. In 2004, he worked for Serie D team Cosenza with little fortune; he then worked for Serie C2 teams Melfi in 2006 and Celano the following year, leading the latter to an impressive season and a spot in the promotion playoffs.

He agreed a one-year extension to his contract with Celano in July 2010. He left the club at the end of the 2010–11 season, the club citing excessive wage demands as the main reason behind the decision.

On 17 January 2012 he was appointed new head coach of last-placed Lega Pro Seconda Divisione club Lecco in place of dismissed predecessor Maurizio Pellegrino. He avoided direct relegation but eventually failed to keep the club into professionalism after losing a playoff to Mantova, and left the club by the end of the season to reunite with Zdeněk Zeman at Roma, where he worked as technical collaborator for the 2012–13 season. After Zeman's dismissal as head coach, he left Roma too, and re-joined his mentor in July 2014 as technical collaborator of Cagliari.

In April 2016 he was named as new head coach of Lega Pro club L'Aquila in place of Carlo Perrone, only to be dismissed himself after less than a month in charge.

On 1 September 2016, Modica was announced as the new head coach of hometown club Mazara, in what was his first time with the club from his native city, as well as his first time in charge of a club in Eccellenza (second-highest level of amateur football in Italy).

He successively served as head coach of Serie D club Messina in the 2017–18 season.

He left Messina for Cavese (Serie D, soon to be readmitted to Serie C to fill vacancies) for the 2018–19 campaign, guiding the club to a mid-table placement in the league, then leaving the club by mutual consent by the end of the season.

On 13 July 2019 he was unveiled as head coach of Serie C club Vibonese.

On 3 July 2020 he was hired again by Cavese. On 11 November 2020, he resigned from Cavese following a bad start for the season, with the club in relegation zone.

In December 2021 he was appointed new head coach of Serie D club Casale. He resigned from his position on 27 February 2022, after achieving only ten points in his eight games in charge.

On 23 July 2022, Modica agreed to return to Vibonese following the club's relegation to Serie D.

References

External links
Career stats(from footballplus.com)

1964 births
Living people
People from Mazara del Vallo
Association football midfielders
Italian footballers
Italian football managers
Calcio Padova players
Palermo F.C. players
S.S. Turris Calcio players
Ternana Calcio players
A.C.R. Messina players
A.C. Ancona players
Calcio Lecco 1912 managers
Cavese 1919 managers
Serie C managers
Footballers from Sicily
Sportspeople from the Province of Trapani